Fudbalski Klub Crvenka (Serbian Cyrillic: ФК Црвенка) is a football club based in Crvenka, Serbia.

History
The club was founded in 1919 as CSK - Crvenački Sportski Klub (Crvenka Sports Club). In 1945, it changed its name to FK Spartakus. In 1962, Spartakus merged with another club from Crvenka, FK Jedinstvo, becoming FK Crvenka. Immediately after, in the 1962–63 season, the club won the Second League Vojvodina North, thus qualifying to the Serbian League North. In 1966, they played in the Yugoslav Second League. Three years later, Crvenka won the Second League North and played the play-offs for the Yugoslav First League but failed to qualify. However, they were successful the following year and won the promotion to the 1970–71 Yugoslav First League. although that season they ended up last and were relegated, they managed to win against Red Star Belgrade who were and are the best team in former Yugoslavia. They remained in the Second League until the 1990s. Afterwards they were further relegated to the third league where they played until 2007, and since then are playing in the regional league

External Links 
 http://www.srbijasport.net/club/93-crvenka-crvenka/results

External Links
 Club at SC Crvenka.

Football clubs in Serbia
Football clubs in Yugoslavia
Football clubs in Vojvodina
Association football clubs established in 1919
1919 establishments in Serbia

Recent Matches

FK ŽAK Sombor 0-0 FK Crvenka